The cuneiform hi/he sign, (and its Sumerograms), has many uses in both the 14th century BC Amarna letters and the Epic of Gilgamesh; also other texts, for example Hittite texts. It is also used to form a second usage of the plural HI.A, . The more common plural is Meš, found in sub-varieties of the sign, a vertical (left), and a horizontal, with 3 wedges, in various position(right); (a digital form)-.

The alphabetic/syllabic uses and Sumerograms of the 'hi' sign from the Epic of Gilgamesh:

he
hi
DÙG (Sumerogram)s
HI 
ŠÁR, = Akkadian šar, (3600), (area of land).

Its usage numbers from the Epic of Gilgamesh are as follows: he-(5), hi-(86), DǛG-(3), HI-(6), and ŠÁR-(13).

References

Moran, William L. 1987, 1992. The Amarna Letters. Johns Hopkins University Press, 1987, 1992. 393 pages.(softcover)
 Parpola, 1971. The Standard Babylonian Epic of Gilgamesh, Parpola, Simo, Neo-Assyrian Text Corpus Project, c 1997, Tablet I thru Tablet XII, Index of Names, Sign List, and Glossary-(pp. 119–145), 165 pages.

Cuneiform signs